Captain George Louis Victor Henry Serge Mountbatten, 2nd Marquess of Milford Haven,  (6 November 1892 – 8 April 1938), born Prince George of Battenberg, styled Earl of Medina between 1917 and 1921, was a Royal Navy officer and the elder son of Louis Mountbatten, 1st Marquess of Milford Haven (Prince Louis of Battenberg), and Princess Victoria of Hesse and by Rhine.

Biography
Prince George of Battenberg, as he then was, was born at Darmstadt in the Grand Duchy of Hesse, then ruled by his maternal uncle Ernest Louis, Grand Duke of Hesse. From birth, he was a prince of the Hessian royal family, albeit of a morganatic branch. His siblings were Princess Alice (mother of Prince Philip, Duke of Edinburgh, to whom he was a mentor in Philip's adolescence), Queen Louise of Sweden and Louis Mountbatten, 1st Earl Mountbatten of Burma (who assumed the role of Philip's mentor after George's death).

George followed his father into the Royal Navy, and after passing out from the Royal Naval College at Dartmouth, was promoted to sub-lieutenant on 15 January 1913. He was promoted to lieutenant on 15 February 1914, and served in the First World War. In 1917, his father and several of his relations relinquished their German names, styles and titles in exchange for British peerages at the behest of George V. Accordingly, Prince George dropped the style of Serene Highness and his surname was anglicised to "Mountbatten." When his father was created Marquess of Milford Haven in late 1917, George received the courtesy title of Earl of Medina, succeeding to his father's peerage after his death in September 1921. During the war, George's aunt Empress Alexandra of Russia along with his uncle by marriage Nicholas II of Russia, five cousins and another aunt Elisabeth were killed by communist revolutionaries.

Lord Milford Haven, as George was now known, remained in the Royal Navy after the war; he was promoted to lieutenant-commander on 15 February 1922 and to commander on 31 December 1926. In 1932, he retired from active service at his own request, with effect from 9 December of that year. On 6 November 1937, shortly before his death, he was promoted to the rank of captain on the retired list.

An accomplished mathematician, the Marquess "could work out complicated gunnery problems in his head" and "read books on calculus casually on trains". Queen Elizabeth II, his niece-in-law, considered him "one of the most intelligent and brilliant of people".

Marriage and issue
Prince George of Battenberg, as he then was known, married Countess Nadejda Mikhailovna de Torby (daughter of Russian Grand Duke Michael Mikhailovich Romanov and his morganatic wife, Countess Sophie von Merenberg) on 15 November 1916 at the Russian Embassy, Welbeck Street, London. They lived at Lynden Manor at Holyport in Berkshire and had two children:
 Lady Tatiana Elizabeth Mountbatten (Edinburgh, Scotland, 16 December 1917 – Northampton, England, 15 May 1988)
 David Michael Mountbatten, 3rd Marquess of Milford Haven (Edinburgh, Scotland, 12 May 1919 – London, England 14 April 1970).

Death
Lord Milford Haven died of bone marrow cancer, aged 45, and was buried in Bray Cemetery, Bray, Berkshire.

Legacy to the British Museum
Lord Milford Haven left artifacts to the British Museum.

Honours
 Knight Commander of the Royal Victorian Order, 1916
 Order of St Vladimir, 4th class, with Swords, authorised to wear 5 June 1917
 Knight of the Military Order of Savoy, authorised to wear 11 August 1917
 Knight Grand Cross of the Royal Victorian Order, 1932

Arms

Ancestry

Notes

References
 

1892 births
1938 deaths
Knights Grand Cross of the Royal Victorian Order
Deaths from multiple myeloma
Deaths from cancer in the United Kingdom
People from Bray, Berkshire
Royal Navy officers of World War I
George
German princes
Recipients of the Order of St. Vladimir, 4th class
Marquesses of Milford Haven
German emigrants to the United Kingdom